Run and Gun II is a basketball video game developed and published by Konami as an arcade video game in 1996.

Background
It is the sequel to Konami's 1993 arcade video game Run and Gun. The original game had earned  from European advance orders prior to release (mostly from Spain and Italy), and was America's top-grossing upright arcade cabinet in December 1993.

Gameplay
Run and Gun II is a sequel that adds maneuvers like alley oops, spins, and defensive moves such as block outs.

Reception
In Japan, Game Machine listed Run and Gun II on their May 1, 1996 issue as being the seventh most-successful arcade game of the month.

Hyper reviewed the arcade game, rating it 4½ out of 5 stars and calling it "an excellent game" that is "far superior to its predecessor." Next Generation rated it three stars out of five, stating that "It's not your father's new Oldsmobile, but it's multiplayer, and dependable good fun."

References

1996 video games
Arcade video games
Arcade-only video games
Basketball video games
Video games developed in Japan